Dhamtari railway station is a main railway station in Dhamtari district, Chhattisgarh. Its code is DTR. It serves Dhamtari city. The station consists of two platforms. The station lies on the Raipur–Dhamtari branch line of Bilaspur–Nagpur section.

Previously, the station was part Raipur–Dhamtari branch line which was the first narrow-gauge line of Bengal Nagpur Railway and was established in 1900.

References

Railway stations in Dhamtari district
Raipur railway division